Albert Lolotai (June 22, 1920 – September 30, 1990) was a Samoa-born American football offensive lineman. He played college football at Weber Junior College. Lolotai was the first Samoan American and Polynesian to play professional American football.

Born in the Western Samoa Trust Territory, Lolotai grew up in Laie, Hawaii. He attended Kahuku High School and graduated from 'Iolani School in Honolulu, Hawai'i. He then attended Weber Junior College (now Weber State University) in Ogden, Utah, playing on the Weber Wildcats football team from 1941 to 1942, and served in the Hawaii Territorial Guard during World War 2. From 1945 to 1949, Lolotai played professional football, first in the National Football League for the Washington Redskins in 1945, then the Los Angeles Dons in the All-America Football Conference from 1946 to 1949, playing in 59 games with 32 starts and making one interception with Washington in 1945.

Lolotai would eventually graduate from Colorado A&M, and with the founding of Church College of Hawaii in 1955, serve as its Athletic Director. He mentored many of the young Samoan football players coming up in the Laie community to keep up with their studies, get into good schools, and helped set them up for their future. 

One of his sons, Tiloi, also attended 'Iolani School and then went to play football for Colorado as a defensive tackle, lettering from 1974-76.

References

External links
Samoan Bios: Al Lolotai

1920 births
1990 deaths
Samoan players of American football
American football offensive guards
Los Angeles Dons players
Washington Redskins players
Weber State Wildcats football players
American sportspeople of Samoan descent
Players of American football from Hawaii
Junior college football players in the United States
Samoan emigrants to the United States